Luca Rangoni (born 23 September 1968 in Bologna) is an Italian auto racing driver. He is a married man with one son.

Early career
Like many racing drivers, Rangoni's first taste of racing was in karts, where he spent four years. He made his debut in circuit racing in the 1989 Italian Formula Alfa Boxer Championship, where he finished sixth on points. This was followed by two years in the Italian F2000 Trophy, which he won in his second year in 1991.

In 1993 he competed in the Italian Formula Three Championship, winning the title in 1995 in a Dallara-Fiat. His success the previous year led to a drive in the 1996 FIA International F3000 Championship. Despite only entering one round in Pau, he ended the year in seventeenth after coming sixth in the race. After his time in Formula 3000 he took a break from racing due to a family tragedy.

Touring cars
He returned to racing in 1999, switching to touring cars with the Renault Sport Clio International Trophy. He dominated the championship, winning four back to back titles between 2000 and 2003.

In 2004 he found a drive in the FIA European Touring Car Championship. Entereing an Alfa Romeo 156, he finished the series in 16th position overall. He returned to the newly named FIA World Touring Car Championship in 2006 for Proteam Motorsport in a BMW 320i. He ended the season in 19th overall, including a podium finish in Valencia, and was runner-up the Yokohama Independents Trophy, behind Tom Coronel, with two wins.

For 2007 Rangoni stayed with Proteam, finishing the year in 14th after another overall podium, one place ahead of works BMW driver and fellow Italian Alessandro Zanardi, and lost the title to the Yokohama Independents Trophy to Stefano D'Aste by two points, in spite of scoring nine wins (including the double points rounds at Macau) to D'Aste's three. For 2008 he raced in the Italian Porsche Carrera Cup, finishing as runner-up, and also raced in the Superstars Series.

Racing record

Complete International Formula 3000 results
(key) (Races in bold indicate pole position) (Races in italics indicate fastest lap)

Complete European Touring Car Championship results
(key) (Races in bold indicate pole position) (Races in italics indicate fastest lap)

Complete World Touring Car Championship results
(key) (Races in bold indicate pole position) (Races in italics indicate fastest lap)

Complete TCR International Series results
(key) (Races in bold indicate pole position) (Races in italics indicate fastest lap)

† Driver did not finish the race, but was classified as he completed over 90% of the race distance.

References

External links
Official Site.

1968 births
Living people
Sportspeople from Bologna
Italian racing drivers
Italian Formula Three Championship drivers
World Touring Car Championship drivers
International Formula 3000 drivers
Superstars Series drivers
Blancpain Endurance Series drivers
European Touring Car Championship drivers
European Touring Car Cup drivers
24 Hours of Spa drivers
TCR International Series drivers
24H Series drivers
AF Corse drivers
International GT Open drivers
TCR Europe Touring Car Series drivers